The Croatian women's national ice hockey team represents Croatia at the International Ice Hockey Federation's IIHF World Women's Championships. The women's national team is controlled by Croatian Ice Hockey Federation. As of 2011, Croatia has 39 female players. Croatia is ranked 33rd in the IIHF World Ranking.

History
Seeing that in Croatia (by status since January 2008) there is only one women's ice hockey club Grič its players are also the only members of the national team. From season 2006/2007 Grič players have been participating in the Slovenian league, along with one Slovenian and one Austrian club.

For several years they have also been participating in an Elite Women's Hockey League with clubs established in the hockey-playing countries (Czech Republic, Slovakia, Germany, Austria and Slovenia).

Tournament record

Olympic Games

The women's team of Croatia has never qualified for an Olympic tournament. In 2008 the team participated in the qualifying tournament for the Winter Olympic Games 2010 in Vancouver. They lost to Slovakia, Latvia and Italy and beat Bulgaria. They won 4th place. At the 2014 qualifying tournament they lost to Spain, Hungary and Denmark and failed to qualify for the next round.

World Championships
In 2007 the Croatian team was the first time involved in the World Championship competition. In the Division IV the team achieved a big surprise by winning the first place in Division IV and was promoted in the Division III.

All-time Record against other nations
As of 14 September 2011

Team

2022 World Championship roster

References

External links

IIHF profile
National Teams of Ice Hockey

Women's national ice hockey teams in Europe
Ice hockey
Ice hockey teams in Croatia